Thylactus zuberhoferi is a species of beetle in the family Cerambycidae. It was described by James Thomson in 1878. It is known from the Ivory Coast, the Central African Republic, Cameroon, and Togo.

References

Xylorhizini
Beetles described in 1878